A list of films produced by the Israeli film industry in 2008.

2008 releases

Awards

Notable deaths

 1 April – Mosko Alkalai, 77, Israeli actor (Blaumilch Canal, The Fox in the Chicken Coop, Yana's Friends) - respiratory failure.  (born 1931)
 1 April – Shosh Atari, 58, Israeli radio presenter and actress - heart attack.  (born 1949)
 20 April – Nissan Nativ, 86, Israeli director, actor and acting teacher.  (born 1922)

See also
2008 in Israel

References

External links
 Israeli films of 2008 at the Internet Movie Database

Israeli
Film
2008